John Howard Leypoldt (March 31, 1946 – February 7, 1987) was an American football placekicker who played eight seasons in the National Football League. Leypoldt died of a heart attack at St. Joseph Intercommunity Hospital in Cheektowaga, New York.https://www.latimes.com/archives/la-xpm-1987-02-08-sp-1208-story.html

1946 births
1987 deaths
American football placekickers
Buffalo Bills players
Seattle Seahawks players
New Orleans Saints players
Northern Virginia Nighthawks football players